Yenakhmetovo (Yänäxmät) is a rural locality (a selo) in Nureyevsky Selsoviet, Sharansky District, Bashkortostan, Russia. The population was 416 as of 2010. There are 4 streets.

Geography 
Yenakhmetovo is located 32 km east of Sharan (the district's administrative centre) by road. Bakhcha is the nearest rural locality.

References 

Rural localities in Sharansky District